Mark Riddick is an American illustrator and graphic artist, specializing in posters and other graphics for death metal and black metal music.

Riddick was born in Bossier City, Louisiana in 1976 and raised in Northern Virginia. He holds a BA degree in Studio Art from Greensboro College, North Carolina. His work has been published by underground bands and fanzines, and by recording acts on metal record labels.

He also contributed art to the heavy metal cartoon Metalocalypse. In 2016, he worked on merchandise for Justin Bieber and designed a collection for The Hundreds.

Bands and clients
 Arch Enemy
 Arsis
 Autopsy
 Dethklok
 Devourment
 Dying Fetus
 Exodus
 Morbid Angel
 Necro (rapper)
 Suffocation
 Suicide Silence
 The Black Dahlia Murder

Books
Killustration (2006)
Rotten Renderings (2008)
Logos From Hell (2008)
Compendium of Death (2012)
Logos from Hell 2 
The Art of Riddick 
Morbid Visions

Cover art
 Arsis – United in Regret
 Arsis – Starve for the Devil
 Cephalic Carnage – Halls of Amenti
 Doomstone – Those Whom Satan Hath Joined
 Embrionic Death Regurgitated Stream of Rot
 Gravehill Rites of the Pentagram
 Kryptos – The Coils of Apollyon
 The Ravenous – Assembled In Blasphemy
 Ruins – Chambers of Perversion
 Witch-hunt – Prophecies of a Great Plague
 Strike Master – Majestic Strike
 Yskelgroth – Unholy Primitive Nihilism
 Gutslit - "Skewered in the sewer"
 Scythelord - Toxic Minds
Rune - The End of Nothing

References

External links
 

American illustrators
Living people
Year of birth missing (living people)